Radio Waves is a radio station in Bhutan. It is currently being run by Kelzang Thinley. It is located in Thimphu, just below Chubachu. The languages used by Radio Waves are Dzongkha and English. The frequency of Radio waves is 88.8 and it was formed on December 10, 2010.

Broadcast Area
Currently Radio Waves broadcasts only in Thimphu.

Programs
Breakfast show
Soo TarHaa
Shh Taxi
Gha Gho Dam
Ni-Mei Gung
Yesteryear wonder
Your day Today
Bhutanism
Now Hits
BIZ Bhutan
News Feed
Radio Greetings
DJ Request
Gong Tse Dom Chobgay
SMS your Music
Charts
I-Pick
Tec-spec

Radio Jockeys
Khandu Wangmo (Dzongkha)
Pema Wangchuk, station manager (Dzongkha)
Vinay Thapa (English)
Kelzang Thinley (English)

References

External links
(Radio) Shangri-La by Lisa Napoli

Radio stations established in 2010
Radio stations in Bhutan
Thimphu